Kappamyces is a genus of fungi belonging to the family Kappamycetaceae.

The species of this genus are found in Southeastern Asia and Australia.

Species:
 Kappamyces laurelensis Letcher & M.J.Powell

References

Fungi